Canny is the surname of:
 John Canny, American computer scientist, namesake of the Canny edge detector
 Nicholas Canny (born 1944), Irish historian
 Paddy Canny (1919–2008), Irish fiddler
 Steven Canny (born 1969), English playwright and BBC executive producer

See also
 Canny edge detector, an image operator which uses a multi-stage algorithm to detect edges
 Uncanny